The 2020 L'Open 35 de Saint-Malo was a professional tennis tournament played on outdoor clay courts. It was the twenty-fifth edition of the tournament which was part of the 2020 ITF Women's World Tennis Tour. It took place in Saint-Malo, France between 7 and 13 September 2020.

Singles main-draw entrants

Seeds

 1 Rankings are as of 31 August 2020.

Other entrants
The following players received wildcards into the singles main draw:
  Clara Burel
  Amandine Hesse
  Marine Partaud
  Margot Yerolymos

The following players received entry from the qualifying draw:
  Audrey Albié
  Flavie Brugnone
  Sara Cakarevic
  Amanda Carreras
  Aubane Droguet
  Elsa Jacquemot
  Diāna Marcinkēviča
  Helene Pellicano

Champions

Singles

 Nadia Podoroska def.  Cristina Bucșa, 4–6, 7–5, 6–2

Doubles

 Paula Kania /  Katarzyna Piter def.  Magdalena Fręch /  Viktorija Golubic, 6–2, 6–4

References

External links
 2020 L'Open 35 de Saint-Malo at ITFtennis.com
 Official website

2020 ITF Women's World Tennis Tour
2020 in French tennis
September 2020 sports events in France
L'Open 35 de Saint-Malo